Birgit Rockmeier (born 29 November 1973 in Moosburg) is a former German sprinter who specialised in the 200 metres.

Rockmeier's personal best time is 22.90 seconds, achieved in July 2001 in Stuttgart. She represented the sports club LG Olympia Dortmund and is the twin sister of Gabi Rockmeier.

Achievements

References

External links 
 

1973 births
Living people
People from Freising (district)
Sportspeople from Upper Bavaria
German female sprinters
German national athletics champions
Olympic athletes of Germany
Athletes (track and field) at the 1996 Summer Olympics
Athletes (track and field) at the 2000 Summer Olympics
Athletes (track and field) at the 2004 Summer Olympics
German twins
Twin sportspeople
World Athletics Championships medalists
European Athletics Championships medalists
World Athletics Indoor Championships medalists
World Athletics Championships winners
Olympic female sprinters